Colonel Ralph Sherman Parr, Jr. (July 1, 1924 – December 7, 2012) was an American double-flying ace of the Korean War. He was credited with a total of ten downed enemy aircraft. He also flew in World War II and the Vietnam War, and is the only person to have been awarded both the United States Army Distinguished Service Cross and the corresponding decoration used by the United States Air Force once it became an independent branch of service, the Air Force Cross.

Early life
Parr was born in 1924, in Portsmouth, Virginia. His parents were Ralph Sherman Parr and May (Morrison) Parr. His father was a US Navy commander who served in both World War I and World War II. One of his brothers was Warren Sherman Parr, a US Navy rear admiral.

Military career
Parr enlisted in the U.S. Army Reserve on November 4, 1942, and he was accepted into the Aviation Cadet Program on February 2, 1943, earning his pilot wings and commission as a 2nd Lieutenant in the U.S. Army Air Forces at Maxwell Field, Alabama, on February 8, 1944.

World War II
His first assignment was as an instructor pilot at Blytheville Army Airfield, Arkansas, from February to September 1944, followed by P-38 Lightning transition training from October 1944 to April 1945. Parr served as a P-38 pilot in various bases in California from April to August 1945, and then served as a P-38 and then P-51 Mustang pilot with the 7th Fighter Squadron of the 49th Fighter Group on Okinawa and then in Japan from August to July 1946.

After returning to the U.S., he left active duty and joined the Air Force Reserve on September 3, 1946.

Post war
Parr was recalled to active duty on February 9, 1948. After returning to active duty, Parr served as a P-51 and then F-84 Thunderjet pilot with the 60th Fighter Squadron at Walker Air Force Base, New Mexico, and then at Otis Air Force Base, Massachusetts, from February 1948 to July 1950.

Korean War
Parr then served as an F-80 Shooting Star pilot with the 7th Fighter Bomber Squadron at Furumaki Air Base, Japan, and then deployed to Korea at Taegu Air Base from July 1950 to May 1951, where he flew several ground attack missions.

He then served as an F-86 Sabre pilot with the 116th Fighter Interceptor Squadron at Geiger Field, Washington, from June to August 1951, and with the 94th Fighter Interceptor Squadron at George Air Force Base, California, from August 1951 to May 1953. Parr returned to Korea as an F-86 pilot with the 335th Fighter Interceptor Squadron of the 4th Fighter Interceptor Wing at Kimpo Air Base from May to September 1953.

One of his missions began on June 7, 1953, when he descended from 41,000 feet over the Yalu River that separated North Korea from China and saw four Soviet MiG-15s. He pursued them, firing his guns and then leveling off at 300 feet. As he rose to 4,000 feet, he realized that he greatly underestimated the enemy's strength. There were 16 MiGs in there and in the following dogfight, he destroyed two MiG-15s and damaged another before withdrawing to safety.

On June 30, his flight came across 16 MiG-15s. He managed to destroy two MiGs. He then helped drive off 10 other MiGs, which were threatening his wing commander, despite low fuel. For his heroic actions, he was awarded Distinguished Service Cross.

During the Korean War, he flew 165 combat missions and helped to develop new combat tactics for fighting MiG-15s. He managed to shoot down a total of ten enemy aircraft, all while flying F-86 Sabres in 47 missions, during the last 7 weeks of the war. He continued to serve with the 334th FIS until February 1954.

On July 27, 1953, the day of the armistice, then Captain Parr scored the last aerial 'kill' of the  Korean War by shooting down an unarmed Soviet Navy Ilyushin Il-12 transport aircraft, which was flying from Port Arthur to Vladivostok through the North Korean airspace. All 21 passengers, including 3 medical staff, were killed. The Soviet Union filed a lawsuit of $1,860,000 against Parr in the International Court of Justice, however the American side denied this.

Post war
After the war, Parr served as an F-86D Sabre Dog air defense pilot with the 4750th Air Defense Group at Vincent Air Force Base, Arizona, from February 1954 to July 1958. Parr served as an Operations Staff Officer with the 73rd Air Defense Division at Tyndall Air Force Base, Florida, from July 1958 to October 1959, and then as an Operations Staff Officer with the Military Assistance and Advisory Group in the Netherlands from October 1959 to September 1962. His next assignment was as an Operations Staff Officer with the 836th Air Division at MacDill Air Force Base, Florida, from September 1962 to January 1963, followed by service as Operations Officer for the 4453rd Combat Crew Training Squadron at MacDill AFB from February to December 1963.

Parr then served as Commander of the 4456th Combat Crew Training Squadron at MacDill AFB from January to July 1964, and then as Operations Officer for the 4454th Combat Crew Training Squadron at Davis-Monthan Air Force Base, Arizona, from August 1964 to January 1965.

He served as Commander of the 4455th Combat Crew Training Squadron at Davis-Monthan AFB from January 1965 to August 1966, and then attended Air War College at Maxwell AFB, Alabama, from August 1966 to August 1967.

Vietnam War

Parr then served as Deputy Commander for Operations of the 12th Tactical Fighter Wing at Cam Ranh Base, South Vietnam, from September 1967 to August 1968, flying F-4 Phantom. He received the Air Force Cross during the siege of Khe Sanh in 1968, for destroying several mortar and machine gun positions of the Viet Cong troops in one aerial sortie. Then completing seven out of eight combat approaches, while flying a heavily damaged F-4, which thereby not only impaired the hostile force's capability to impede the resupply of Khe Sanh, but also reduced further losses to friendly cargo aircraft and crews. He also was nominated for Medal of Honor by the U.S. Marine Corps command in Khe Sanh.

Following the completion of his first tour in Vietnam, he served on the staff of the Military Personnel Group at Randolph Air Force Base, Texas, from October 1968 to March 1970. During his second tour in Vietnam, he served as the Vice Commander of the 12th TFW at Phù Cát Air Base, South Vietnam, from March to October 1970, and then as Commander of the 12th TFW from October 1970 to April 1971.

Post war
Parr served on the staff at Headquarters U.S. Air Forces in Europe at Lindsey Air Station, West Germany, from April 1971 to August 1972, and then with the Military Assistance and Advisory Group to Iran from August 1972 to January 1974. His final assignment was as Director of Operations for the Tactical Air Warfare Center at Eglin Air Force Base, Florida, from January 1974.

Parr was medically retired from the Air Force in 1976, after injuring his back while inspecting damage to the roof of his home at Elgin AFB, after a hurricane.

Later life

He was married to Margaret Parr for forty years. They had six stepchildren and 10 grandchildren.

In 2001, Parr participated in a meeting with former Soviet pilots who fought in Korea. At this meeting, he said:

Pilots of both sides respect each other very much. There is no hostility between them.

Parr appeared in "MiG Alley" (2006), during season one, episode one, and "Jet vs. Jet" (2007), season two, episode three, of the History Channel's Dogfights series, which recreated historical air combat campaigns using modern computer graphics.

Parr died on December 7, 2012, at an assisted living facility in New Braunfels, Texas, at the age of 88, and was buried with full military honors at Fort Sam Houston National Cemetery.

Awards and decorations
Col. Parr is the only person ever awarded both the Distinguished Service Cross and the Air Force Cross.

His personal awards are:

Air Force Cross citation

Parr, Ralph Sherman
Colonel, U.S. Air Force
12th Tactical Fighter Wing, Cam Ranh Bay Air Base, Vietnam
Date of Action:  March 16, 1968

Citation:

The President of the United States of America, authorized by Title 10, Section 8742, United States Code, takes pleasure in presenting the Air Force Cross to Colonel Ralph Sherman Par, United States Air Force, for extraordinary heroism in military operations against an opposing force as an F-4C Phantom Aircraft Commander and Commanding Officer of the 12th Tactical Fighter Wing, Cam Ranh Bay Air Base, Vietnam, in action near Khe Sanh, Republic of Vietnam, on 16 March 1968. On that date, Colonel Parr participated in a flight providing cover for cargo aircraft. Upon arrival over the target, the forward air controller advised the flight that the airfield was under heavy attack by hostile mortar positions, which were located a few feet below a ridge line. Although the target area was covered with dense smoke and haze, Colonel Parr successfully destroyed one mortar position on his first pass, as six well-camouflaged heavy automatic weapons opened fire on him. Although sustaining severe damage to his aircraft, he pressed his second attack and destroyed another mortar position. Again, completely disregarding his personal safety and the withering hostile gun fire, Colonel Parr succeeded in destroying six heavy caliber automatic weapons positions. In between passes, his accurate and timely directions to his wingman effectively insured the accuracy of ordnance delivery in close proximity to the friendly forces. Only after delivering all of his ordnance at point-blank range in eight consecutive passes did Colonel Parr terminate his attack. By destroying these strategically located weapons, he not only impaired the hostile force's capability to impede the resupply of Khe Sanh, but also reduced further losses to friendly cargo aircraft and crews. Through his superb airmanship, aggressiveness, and extraordinary heroism, Colonel Parr reflected the highest credit upon himself and the United States Air Force.

Distinguished Service Cross citation

Parr, Ralph Sherman
Captain, U.S. Air Force
334th Fighter Interceptor Squadron, 4th Fighter Interceptor Wing, 5th Air Force
Date of Action:  June 30, 1953

Citation:
The President of the United States of America, under the provisions of the Act of Congress approved July 9, 1918, takes pleasure in presenting the Distinguished Service Cross (Air Force) to Captain Ralph Sherman Parr, United States Air Force, for extraordinary heroism in connection with military operations against an armed enemy of the United Nations while serving as Pilot of an F-86 type aircraft of the 334th Fighter-Interceptor Squadron, 4th Fighter-Interceptor Wing, Fifth Air Force, in action against enemy forces in the Republic of Korea on 30 June 1953. On that date, while leading a formation of two F-86 type aircraft on a combat air patrol deep in enemy territory, Captain Parr was attacked by a formation of ten enemy MIGs. Exhibiting superb airmanship and extraordinary gallantry, Captain Parr positioned himself on the attackers. Despite the imminent threat from the hail of cannon fire from behind, Captain Parr selected his target, and with a long burst from his guns, destroyed one of the enemy MIGs. Against superior numbers of enemy aircraft, Captain Parr, although under a continual hail of enemy cannon fire, and with complete disregard for his personal safety, again valiantly counter-attacked another of the threatening aircraft. Utilizing extraordinary flying skill, Captain Parr tenaciously followed the enemy through a series of violent, evasive maneuvers until he gained the advantage and scored multiple hits on the MiG, causing it to burst into flame. While turning to move to surprise another of the enemy aircraft, Captain Parr broke off his attack to answer a call of distress from a friendly aircraft. Although dangerously low on fuel, Captain Parr, at great risk to his life, provided aggressive and determined protection for the distressed friendly aircraft, escorting it safely back to base. Captain Parr's keen flying skill in turning the tide of battle despite overwhelming odds and his high personal courage in protecting a fellow pilot evidenced conspicuous gallantry in action, and reflected great credit upon himself, the Far East Air Forces and the United States Air Force.

See also
List of Korean War flying aces

References

Valor Awards for Ralph Sherman Parr at militarytimes.com. Retrieved 2012-12-09.

External links

Double Ace – Col. Ralph Parr at Airwingmedia.com
Ralph Parr – FU Hero at fighterpilotuniversity.com

1924 births
2012 deaths
American Korean War flying aces
United States Air Force personnel of the Vietnam War
Aviators from Texas
Aviators from Virginia
People from Portsmouth, Virginia
People from New Braunfels, Texas
United States Air Force colonels
Military personnel from Virginia
Recipients of the Air Force Cross (United States)
Recipients of the Air Medal
Recipients of the Distinguished Flying Cross (United States)
Recipients of the Distinguished Service Cross (United States)
Recipients of the Legion of Merit
Recipients of the Silver Star
Recipients of the Meritorious Service Medal (United States)
Recipients of the Gallantry Cross (Vietnam)
United States Air Force officers
United States Army Air Forces pilots of World War II
United States Army Air Forces officers
Burials at Fort Sam Houston National Cemetery
Military personnel from Texas